Arp 273 is a pair of interacting galaxies, 300 million light years away in the constellation Andromeda. It was first described in the Atlas of Peculiar Galaxies, compiled by Halton Arp in 1966. The larger of the spiral galaxies, known as UGC 1810, is about five times more massive than the smaller galaxy. It has a disc that is tidally distorted into a rose-like shape by the gravitational pull of the companion galaxy below it, known as UGC 1813. The smaller galaxy shows distinct signs of active star formation at its nucleus, and "it is thought that the smaller galaxy has actually passed through the larger one."

References

External links

 
Image with information of scale & compass location retrieved 20/09/2011

Interacting galaxies
Unbarred spiral galaxies
Barred spiral galaxies
01810
Articles containing video clips
0273
+06-06-023
08961
Andromeda (constellation)